Paul Fisher may refer to:

 Paul A. Fisher (1921–2007), American author and journalist
 Paul Fisher (cricketer, born 1954) (born 1954), English cricketer and educationalist
 Paul Fisher (cricketer, born 1977) (born 1977), English cricketer
 Paul C. Fisher (1913–2006), American industrialist and inventor of the Fisher Space Pen
 Paul Fisher (fictional), a fictional character in the book Tangerine
 Paul Fisher (economist) (born 1958), member of the Bank of England's Monetary Policy Committee
 Paul Fisher (agent), model agent
 Paul Fisher (footballer) (born 1951), English footballer
 Paul Fisher (sailor) (born 1962), Bermudian Olympic sailor

See also
 Paul Fischer (disambiguation)